Hinjilicut is a town and municipality of  Ganjam district in the Indian state of Odisha.

Geography

Demographics
 India, Hinjilicut had a population of 25,092 . Males constitute 51% of the population and females 49%. Hinjilicut has an average literacy rate of 64%, higher than the national average of 59.5%: male literacy is 74%, and female literacy is 54%. In Hinjilicut, 13% of the population is under 6 years of age.

Greater Hinjilicut population is 56,239

Politics
Current MLA from Hinjili Assembly Constituency is Naveen Patnaik of BJD, the Chief Minister of Odisha who won the seat in State elections of 2014 and also in 2009,2004 and 2000. Previous MLAs from this seat were Udayanath Nayak of INC in 1995 and in 1985, Harihar Sahu of JD in 1990, and Brundaban Nayak who won in 1980 as JNP(SC) candidate and as an INC candidate in 1977.

Hinjili is part of Aska (Lok Sabha constituency).

Notable people

 Naveen Patnaik – Chief Minister of Odisha

References

External links
 http://www.gloriousindia.com/unleashed/place.php?id=4546

Cities and towns in Ganjam district